Tunari is a commune in the center of Ilfov County, Muntenia, Romania. Its name means "cannoneers" in Romanian. It is composed of two villages, Dimieni and Tunari.

It has the following neighbors:

 To the north: Henri Coandă International Airport and Balotești commune, separated by the Bucharest–Urziceni railway.
 To the south: the Pipera district of Voluntari commune, separated by the  Bucharest–Constanța railway and the Bucharest Ring Motorway on the Otopeni–Ștefăneștii de Jos segment.
 To the east: Ștefăneștii de Jos commune.
 To the west: the town of Otopeni.

The town has a Romanian Orthodox church, named after Saint Nicholas; it was built in 1702 by Marica Brâncoveanu.

References

Communes in Ilfov County
Localities in Muntenia